Kimber Lake is a very small lake in the Kenora District of Ontario, Canada. It has one short stream leading out of it, into a smaller lake called Skull Lake.

See also
List of lakes in Ontario

Lakes of Kenora District